Miss Universe Ireland 2017, was the 54th edition of the Miss Universe Ireland. 30 finalists competed for the title of Miss Universe Ireland. Director Brittany Mason crowned Cailín Toíbín as the new Miss Universe Ireland.

Results

Semi-finalist 
30 finalists competed for the title:

Crossovers
Miss Earth
2016: : Julieann McStravick (Top 16)

References

2017 beauty pageants
Miss Universe Ireland